Luciano Daniel Romero (born 28 August 1993) is an Argentine footballer who plays for Chilean club Unión San Felipe as an attacking midfielder.

References

External links

 Profile in ESPN
 Profile in ole.com.ar
 Profile in pasionfutbol.com
 

1993 births
Living people
Footballers from Buenos Aires
Association football midfielders
Argentine footballers
Argentine expatriate footballers
Club Atlético River Plate footballers
Club Atlético Douglas Haig players
Deportivo Armenio footballers
Deportes La Serena footballers
Renofa Yamaguchi FC players
Club Atlético Fénix players
Barracas Central players
Unión San Felipe footballers
Club Almirante Brown footballers
Argentine Primera División players
Primera Nacional players
Primera B de Chile players
J2 League players
Primera B Metropolitana players
Argentine expatriate sportspeople in Chile
Expatriate footballers in Chile
Argentine expatriate sportspeople in Japan
Expatriate footballers in Japan